Alone Together is the fifth studio album of Polish progressive rock group Quidam, released 2007. The album consists of nine songs of melodic symphonic rock. Compared to the previous album, SuREvival, there are no personnel changes at all.

Track listing 
All songs are composed by Zbysek Florek, Bartek Kossowicz,  Maciek Meller, Marta Nowosielska, Maciek Wróblewski and Mariusz Ziólkowski.

 "Different" – 3:16
 "Kinds Of Solitude At Night" – 6:00
 "Depicting Colours Of Emotions" – 10:18
 "They Are There To Remind Us" – 7:49
 "Of Illusions" – 8:04
 "We Lost" – 8:26
 "One Day We Find" – 6:46
 "We Are Alone Together" – 8:20
 "P.S. But Strong Together" – 4:25

Personnel 

 Zbyszek Florek – keyboards, backing vocals, mixing
 Maciek Meller – guitars, backing vocals
 Bartek Kossowicz – vocals, backing        vocals
 Mariusz Ziółkowski – bass guitar, backing        vocals
 Maciek Wróblewski – drums, percussion
 Jacek Zasada – flutes
and:
 Emila Nazaruk – backing vocals on "Kinds of Solitude at Night"
 Piotr Nazaruk – xaphoon on "Different" and zither on "Kinds of Solitude at Night"
 Piotr Rogóż – alto sax on "We Lost"
 Michał Florczak – cover art and booklet design
 Joachim Krukowski – mixing

Charts

References

2007 albums
Quidam (band) albums